Alain Lebas (born 10 November 1953) is a French sprint canoeist who competed from the late 1970s to the early 1980s. Competing in two Summer Olympics, he won a silver medal in the K-1 1000 m event at Moscow in 1980.

Lebas also won two medals at the ICF Canoe Sprint World Championships with a silver (K-2 10000 m: 1978) and a bronze (K-2 500 m: 1979).

References

Sports-reference.com profile

1953 births
Canoeists at the 1976 Summer Olympics
Canoeists at the 1980 Summer Olympics
French male canoeists
Living people
Olympic canoeists of France
Olympic silver medalists for France
Olympic medalists in canoeing
ICF Canoe Sprint World Championships medalists in kayak
Medalists at the 1980 Summer Olympics
20th-century French people